Poshot (also known as  Ḩasan Kenār, Poshad, Poshd, Pūshāt, Pūshāt, Pūshowd, and Pūsht) is a village in Sand-e Mir Suiyan Rural District, Dashtiari District, Chabahar County, Sistan and Baluchestan Province, Iran. At the 2006 census, its population was 220, in 44 families.

References 

Populated places in Chabahar County